Naomi House and Jacksplace are the hospices for children and young people in the Wessex region. The hospices are located at Sutton Scotney, near Winchester, Hampshire, England. It is also known as The Wessex Children's Hospice Trust, (No.1002832). Naomi House and Jacksplace provide care to more than 300 children and young people with life-limiting and life-threatening conditions.  The care and support that Naomi House offers is claimed to be unique in central southern England. They offer respite care, emergency support, a hospice at home service, end of life care and family support.

The hospices provide palliative care to children, young people and their families in communities across seven counties - Berkshire, Dorset, Hampshire, Isle of Wight, Surrey, West Sussex and Wiltshire.

Naomi House cares for children up to the age of 16, and Jacksplace offers care for young people aged 16 to 35. Each hospice is purpose-built and offers an appropriate, engaging environment for each age group.

The charity needs to raise £8.5 million a year to run a full service and deliver its plans. The charity receives less than 15% of its income from statutory sources, the remaining amount is raised and donated by individuals, groups and businesses. Many people get involved by organizing or taking part in fundraising events whereas other individuals choose to volunteer their time.

The hospices are staffed by Paediatric Palliative Care Consultants, doctors, nurses, carers and therapy specialists.

Naomi House has been open to families since June 1997. Jacksplace was officially opened by the Countess of Wessex on 30 November 2010. The hospices have cared for more than 1,100 families.

There are ten children's bedrooms and five family bedrooms at Naomi House and seven bedrooms available at Jacksplace. There are facilities such as music therapy, computers, art and play rooms and multi-sensory and hydrotherapy suites at both hospices. 

The charity's Clarendon Way Walk is the annual flagship event that sees thousands of supporters walk  along the Clarendon Way, between Winchester and Salisbury Cathedrals. 

Naomi House launched a major redevelopment of the hospice building in 2014. Called the Caterpillar Appeal, the charity raised more than £4million to fully refurbish the hospice. Changes to the building included larger bedrooms, a new spiritual space, improved family accommodation, better kitchen and dining spaces and the creation of areas for music therapy and messy play.

The hospices are located on the Sutton Manor Estate, once home to J Arthur Rank and The Rank Organisation. The charity pays an annual peppercorn rent of 12 red roses to the estate's owners, the Cornelius-Reid family, each Midsummer's Day. Naomi House is named after Naomi Cornelius-Reid. Jacksplace is named after Jack Witham, a wealthy local businessman who left the charity an exceptionally generous legacy in his will.

References

External links 
 
New charity shop supports Naomi House

Hospices in England
Buildings and structures in Hampshire
Health in Hampshire
Charities based in Hampshire